The Geering was an English automobile manufactured from 1899 until 1904 by T Geering & Son makers of stationary engines.  A product of Rolvenden, Kent, it was a crude car powered by a 3 hp twin-cylinder engine with chain drive; it ran on paraffin.

See also
 List of car manufacturers of the United Kingdom

References
David Burgess Wise, The New Illustrated Encyclopedia of Automobiles

Veteran vehicles
Defunct motor vehicle manufacturers of England
Defunct companies based in Kent